Morris Municipal Airport, also known as James R. Washburn Field, is a public use airport  north of Morris, Illinois. The airport is publicly owned by the City of Morris.

Facilities
The airport has one paved runway. In 2019, the airport was awarded nearly $12 million to build a new crosswind runway to make the airport accessible in a wider array of weather conditions.

The airport has a fixed-base operator (FBO) offering fuel and aircraft parking. Aircraft parking, rental cars, conference rooms, a lounge, office space, and courtesy cars are also available. Aircraft maintenance, flight training, and aircraft rental are offered to local pilots.

Aircraft
For the 12-month period ending February 29, 2020, the airport averaged 116 aircraft operations per day, or about 42,000 per year. This includes 97% general aviation, 2% air taxi, and less than 1% military. For the same period, there were 59 aircraft based on the field: 54 single-engine and 3 multi-engine airplanes, 1 jet, and 1 helicopter.

References 

Airports in Illinois
Transportation in Grundy County, Illinois